Chalam (born Simhachalam Korada) (18 May 1929 - 4 May 1989) was an Indian film actor, and producer known for his works primarily in Telugu cinema, and Telugu theatre. In 1971 he produced and acted in Mattilo Manikyam which won the Best Feature Film in Telugu at the 19th National Film Awards. In a film career spanning 30 years, Chalam was starred in about 150 films in a variety of roles.

Personal life
Chalam married Ramanakumari, and changed his name to Ramana Chalam. They have 3 children. Ramana Kumari died in 1964 in a fire accident. Chalam later married, to Urvasi Sharada, his co-star in her debut film, Tandrulu Kodukulu in 1972. They later divorced in 1984.

Death
Chalam died on 4 May 1989. Due to alcohol addication.in his final days he also suffered from depression.

Selected filmography

Actor

 Kodarikam (1953)
 Naa Chellelu (1953)
 Thodu Dongalu (1954)
 Jataka Phalam (1954)
 Vadinagaari Gajulu (1955)
 Santanam (1955)
 Bhale Ramudu (1956)
 Sarangadhara (1957)
 Vaddante Pelli (1957) as Pasupati
 Pelli Sandadi (1959)
 Nithya Kalyanam Paccha Thoranam [1960]
 Kuladaivam (1960)
 Abhimanam (1960)
 Vagdanam (1961)
 Tandrulu Kodukulu (1961)
 Pellikaani Pillalu (1961)
 Siri Sampadalu (1962)
 Paruvu Prathishta (1963)
 Dr. Chakravarthy (1964)
 Babruvahana (1964) as Babruvahana
 Kalavari Kodalu (1964)
 Peetala Meedha Pelli  (1964)
 Sri Satyanarayana Mahathyam (1964)
 Sri Simhachala Kshetra Mahima (1965)
 Preminchi Choodu (1965)
 Aatma Gowravam (1965)
 Visala Hrudayalu (1965)
 Navarathri (1966)
 Adugu Jaadalu (1966)
 Pattukunte Padivelu (1967)
 Private Master (1967)
 Poola Rangadu (1967)
 Brahmachari (1968)
 Manchi Kutumbam (1968)
 Evaru Monagadu (1968)
 Bhale Monagadu (1968)
 Govula Gopanna (1968)
 Manushulu Marali (1969)
 Sattekalapu Satteyya (1969)
 Chiranjeevi (1969)
 Nindu Hrudayalu (1969)
 Sambarala Rambabu (1970)
 Mattilo Manikyam (1971)
 Pattindalla Bangaram (1971)
 Bomma Borusa (1971)
 Bullemma Bullodu (1972)
 Ooriki Upakaari (1973)
  Ramude Devudu (1973)
 Devudamma (1973) as Devudu
 Thota Ramudu (1974)
 Amma Manasu (1974)
 Bantrotu Bharya (1974)
 Tulabharam (1974)
 Chairman Chalamaiah (1974)
  Sitamma Santanam (1977)
 Lambadolla Ramdasu (1978)
 Chilipi Krishnudu (1978)
 Pranam Khareedu (1978)
 Annadammula Savaal (1978)
 Dudu Basavanna (1978) as Basavanna
 Chillra Kottu Chittemma (1978)
 Kaliyuga Mahabharatam (1978)
 Gorintaku (1979)
 Aakali Rajyam (1981)
 Pelli Chesi Choopistaam" (1983)
 Allullostunnaru (1984)
 Sri Shirdi Saibaba Mahathyam (1986)

Producer
 Sambarala Rambabu  (1970)
 Mattilo Manikyam  (1971)
 Pelli Chesi choopistaam  (1983)

Awards
National Film Awards
Best Feature Film in Telugu  (Producer) Mattilo Manikyam

References

External links

20th-century Indian male actors
Telugu male actors
Indian male film actors
Film producers from Andhra Pradesh
1929 births
Nandi Award winners
Indian male stage actors
Male actors in Tamil cinema
Male actors in Hindi cinema
Male actors from Andhra Pradesh
People from West Godavari district
Telugu film producers
People from Palakollu
1989 deaths
20th-century comedians
Male actors in Telugu cinema